The Andaman cuckoo-dove (Macropygia rufipennis) is a species of bird in the family Columbidae.

It is endemic to the Andaman and Nicobar Islands. It is becoming rare due to habitat loss.

References

Andaman cuckoo-dove
Andaman cuckoo-dove
Near threatened animals
Near threatened biota of Asia
Andaman cuckoo-dove
Taxonomy articles created by Polbot
Andaman cuckoo-dove